Lars Lillo-Stenberg (born 30 June 1962) is a Norwegian rock musician. He is the man behind the Norwegian band deLillos, but he also played in The Last James and still plays in the band Young Neils. He has also recorded many solo albums. He is the son of the actors Per Lillo-Stenberg and Mette Lange-Nilsen. He grew up at Frogner in Oslo. Lillo-Stenberg is married to the actress Andrine Sæther.

Discography
Å jeg var en sangfugl 10 September 1996, Kirkelig Kulturverksted
the Freak recorded by Universal, 1999).
Oslo recorded 9 April 2000 by Sonet
Buddy
song from movie "Elling" (Motion Picture by Maipo Film Og TV Produksjon): "Se På Meg" (released as CD-single, 2001)
Synger Prøysen (Philips - 2006)

References

1962 births
Living people
Norwegian rock musicians
Norwegian male singers
Norwegian songwriters
English-language singers from Norway
People educated at Oslo Waldorf School
Norwegian multi-instrumentalists